Fraxinus oxycarpa 'Raywood' known as the claret ash or Raywood ash is a cultivar of ash tree, a seedling variant of the Caucasian ash (Fraxinus angustifolia subsp. oxycarpa).

History
The original seedling was discovered near a group of assorted ash trees in Sewell's nursery in the Mount Lofty Ranges in South Australia about 1910, and later grown at the nearby property, "Raywood" (former home of the Downer family). Tullie Cornthwaite Wollaston (1863–1931), an opal dealer, is credited with its discovery and propagation in the now heritage-listed garden there.

In 1937, claret ash trees were planted along the central reservation and verges of Anzac Highway in Adelaide when it was redeveloped into a dual carriageway.

The tree was introduced to Britain in 1928 and to North America in 1956, although it did not become widely available there until 1979.

Description
The claret ash is a cultivar of ash tree, a seedling variant of the Caucasian ash (Fraxinus angustifolia subsp. oxycarpa).

The bark of the tree is notably smoother than the Caucasian ash, which is quite apparent on those trees grafted on Caucasian ash stock. In Australia and the United States a decline or dieback in some older trees has been observed, which has been attributed to a combination of environmental stress and the presence of the fungus Botryosphaeria.

References

External links
 Fraxinus oxycarpa 'Raywood' Oregon State Univ., Landscape Plants
  Gordon, Thomas R. (2004). Investigation into the etiology of decline of Raywood ash in Northern California.

Fraxinus
Ornamental trees
Ornamental plant cultivars